"Several Species of Small Furry Animals Gathered Together in a Cave and Grooving with a Pict" is a track written and performed by Roger Waters from the 1969 Pink Floyd double album, Ummagumma.
It holds the distinction of having the longest title of any of the band's songs.

Sounds and recording
The track consists of several minutes of noises resembling rodents and birds simulated by Waters' voice and other techniques, such as tapping the microphone played at different speeds, followed by Waters providing a few stanzas of spoken word in an exaggerated Scottish burr.

The Picts were the indigenous people of what is now Scotland who merged with the Scots. There is a hidden message in the song at about 4:32. If played at half speed, Waters can be heard to say, "That was pretty avant-garde, wasn't it?" Also, at the very end of the rant, Waters is heard to say, "Thank you."

A small sample of these effects can also be heard at about 4:48 on Waters' other track on Ummagumma, "Grantchester Meadows".

In popular culture

The title of the Man or Astro-man? song "Many Pieces of Large Fuzzy Mammals Gathered Together at a Rave and Schmoozing with a Brick" is based on this song.

A quotation in the Karl Edward Wagner novel Bloodstone (1975) pays tribute to the song: "several species of small furry animals gathered together in cave and grooving with a pict."

Personnel
Roger Waters – vocalisations and tape effects

References

External links

1969 songs
1960s instrumentals
Pink Floyd songs
Songs written by Roger Waters
Experimental music compositions